The Kaohsiung Grand Hotel is a hotel located in Niaosong District, Kaohsiung, Taiwan. The hotel is located next to the Chengcing Lake. The Grand Hotel is a sister hotel of the main Grand Hotel in Taipei City, the Taipei Grand Hotel.

History
The hotel was established in 1957 near Kaohsiung and in 1971 was moved to its present location.

Architecture
The hotel was built with a combination of Western and classic Eastern architectural style.

See also
 Grand Hotel (Taipei)

References

External links

 
 圓山大飯店 The Grand Hotel on YouTube

1971 establishments in Taiwan
Buildings and structures in Kaohsiung
Hotel buildings completed in 1971
Hotels established in 1957
Hotels in Kaohsiung